Vizantea-Livezi is a commune located in Vrancea County, Romania. It is composed of five villages: Livezile (the commune center), Mesteacănu, Piscu Radului, Vizantea Mănăstirească and Vizantea Răzășească. It was formed in 1968 by merging the first three (the former commune of Livezi) with the latter two (the former commune of Vizantea).

At the 2011 census, of the inhabitants for whom data were available, 99.9% were Romanians. 69.2% were Romanian Orthodox and 30.5% Roman Catholic.

References

External links
Vizantea-Livezi

Communes in Vrancea County
Localities in Western Moldavia